Season thirty-one of the television program American Experience aired on the PBS network in the United States on January 15, 2019 and concluded on September 10, 2019. The season contained seven new episodes and began with the film The Swamp.

Episodes

References

2019 American television seasons
American Experience